Plymouth Friends Meetinghouse is a historic Quaker meeting house located at the corner of Germantown Pike and Butler Pike in Plymouth Meeting, Montgomery County, Pennsylvania. It is part of the Plymouth Meeting Historic District, and was added to the National Register of Historic Places in 1971.

It was built in 1708, and is constructed of native limestone. A wing was added in 1780, and the interior was rebuilt in 1867 following a fire.  The porch was also added in 1867, and a rear wing added in 1945.

During the American Revolutionary War, the building served as a temporary military hospital. Troops under the Marquis de Lafayette camped on the grounds prior to the May 20, 1778 Battle of Barren Hill. The meeting house was a hub of activity during the Underground Railroad. Lucretia Mott lectured across the street at Abolition Hall, and is known to have attended the meeting.  Artist and teacher Thomas Hovenden (1840–1895) was a member of the meeting and is buried in the adjacent cemetery.

Plymouth Meeting Friends School is under the care of the meeting and is located on site.

Several scenes in the historical novel The Quakeress (1905) by Max Adler take place in the meetinghouse.

References

External links

 

Cemeteries in Montgomery County, Pennsylvania
Churches on the Underground Railroad
Quaker meeting houses in Pennsylvania
Churches on the National Register of Historic Places in Pennsylvania
Churches completed in 1708
Churches in Montgomery County, Pennsylvania
18th-century Quaker meeting houses
National Register of Historic Places in Montgomery County, Pennsylvania
1708 establishments in Pennsylvania
Underground Railroad in Pennsylvania
Individually listed contributing properties to historic districts on the National Register in Pennsylvania
Plymouth Meeting, Pennsylvania